Hall Lake is a lake in Clearwater County, Minnesota, in the United States.

Hall Lake was named for Edwin S. Hall, a government surveyor.

See also
List of lakes in Minnesota

References

Lakes of Minnesota
Lakes of Clearwater County, Minnesota